Rodney Roy Beck (August 3, 1968 – June 23, 2007), nicknamed "Shooter", was a relief pitcher in Major League Baseball who played for the San Francisco Giants (–), Chicago Cubs (–), Boston Red Sox (1999–) and San Diego Padres (–). He batted and threw right-handed.

Career

San Francisco Giants
The Oakland Athletics drafted Beck as a starting pitcher in the 13th round (327th pick) of the 1986 Major League Baseball Draft. Prior to the 1988 season, he was traded to the San Francisco Giants organization. In , while with the San Jose Giants of the California League, he posted a record of 11–2 between opening day and June 14, when he was promoted to the Shreveport Captains of the Double A Texas League.

Beck made his Major League debut on May 6, 1991, against the Montreal Expos. His performance was forgettable (2.0 IP, 3 H, 2 ER), but his season numbers were more impressive. He had a 3.78 ERA, pitched  innings in 31 games, and struck out 38 while walking 13. In , Beck took over as the regular closer from Dave Righetti and posted a record of 3–3 with 17 saves and a 1.76 ERA. He pitched 92 innings over 65 games and struck out 87 while walking only 15. In  he recorded 48 saves, including 24 consecutive. At the time, both marks were Giants franchise records. Beck found success using a sinker, slider, and splitter.

September 18, 1997
On September 17 and 18, 1997, the Los Angeles Dodgers came to San Francisco to play a two-game series at Candlestick Park. The Dodgers were leading the National League West with a record of 84–67. The Giants were in 2nd place with a record of 82–69; 2 games behind. The Giants won the first game 2–1 behind lefty Kirk Rueter. In that contest, Barry Bonds hit a two-run homer in the first inning for the Giants, while Raúl Mondesí hit a solo shot in the fifth for the Dodgers. Beck did not pitch in the game.

On September 18, he came into the game in the top of the 10th with the score tied 5–5. As the season had progressed, Beck had lost his closer's job to Roberto Hernández. In fact, Beck had blown a save three days earlier in Atlanta while trying to close that game. He had given up 4 earned runs in just  of an inning. Beck got into trouble immediately by giving up consecutive singles to Mike Piazza, Eric Karros, and Raúl Mondesí. With the bases loaded, nobody out and the crowd booing loudly, manager Dusty Baker came out to talk to Beck, who was obviously struggling. Baker told Beck, "You're the guy."

Baker left Beck in, and Beck proceeded to strike out Todd Zeile looking at an inside-corner fastball. When he got pinch hitter Eddie Murray to bounce a splitter into an inning-ending double play, the crowd of 52,188 went crazy. Two innings later, Giants reserve catcher Brian Johnson led off with a home run to left field, giving Beck a 6–5 win. The Giants, now tied with the Dodgers for the division lead, would go on to win the Western Division crown.

Chicago Cubs
After the 1997 season, the Giants felt Beck's best years were behind him, and allowed him to leave as a free agent to sign with the Chicago Cubs, replacing him with Robb Nen. Beck set a career high in saves in 1998, his first season with the Cubs, converting 51 of 58 chances. However, in the 1999 season, Beck battled injury, and was traded by Chicago to the Boston Red Sox in exchange for reliever Mark Guthrie and a player to be named later, who turned out to be Cole Liniak.

Boston Red Sox
Beck pitched well for the surging Red Sox, although he struggled in the postseason (giving up a Bernie Williams walk-off home run in Game One of the 1999 ALCS) and was not as good in his two full seasons with the team as he had been in the past. After the 2001 season, Beck had Tommy John surgery and missed the 2002 season.

Beck to the Minors
Beck successfully recovered from Tommy John surgery and, as a free agent, was signed by the Cubs in January 2003. While pitching for the team's AAA affiliate Iowa Cubs during his comeback, Beck gained national attention for living in a motor home behind the team's Sec Taylor Stadium (now Principal Park) in Des Moines. Beck warmly welcomed fans to drop by and visit, signed autographs and offered free beer. This time he did not play in the majors for the Cubs, and they released him in May 2003.

San Diego Padres
Immediately after leaving the Cubs in 2003, Beck returned to the Major Leagues with the Padres to fill in for the injured Trevor Hoffman. He converted 20 saves in 20 chances, while posting a 1.78 ERA. His statistics earned him the National League Comeback Player of the Year award. In 2004, Beck dealt with personal problems during Spring Training and struggled in a seventh inning role for the Padres. Beck was released by San Diego in August.

Death
On June 23, Beck died alone at his home in Phoenix, Arizona. The Maricopa County medical examiner did not publicly disclose the cause of death and the Phoenix police did not suspect foul play. Beck's ex-wife stated she believed Beck's death to be drug related. Cocaine and heroin were found in his home and bedroom.

Beck was buried in Phoenix wearing his Chicago Cubs uniform despite pitching only two seasons for the team. He was added to the  ballot for the Baseball Hall of Fame, earlier than the typical retirement rule due to his death, and received two votes.

See also
 List of unsolved deaths

References

External links

 ChicagoCubsOnline.com coverage  at 2007 Cubs Convention
 Rod Beck at Baseballbiography.com
 

1968 births
2007 deaths
Major League Baseball pitchers
Baseball players from California
San Francisco Giants players
Chicago Cubs players
Boston Red Sox players
San Diego Padres players
National League All-Stars
Sportspeople from Burbank, California
Baseball players from Phoenix, Arizona
Medford A's players
Clinton Giants players
San Jose Giants players
Shreveport Captains players
Phoenix Firebirds players
Iowa Cubs players
Pawtucket Red Sox players
Unsolved deaths in the United States